Elpis Melena (1818–1899, born as Marie Espérance von Schwartz) was a German writer.

Daughter of a Hamburg banker, she was born in England and spent much of her early life in Italy and England. She was well known in connection with the movement for Italian unity and freedom and edited the first version of Garibaldi's memoirs in German, published in English in 1887. After first meeting Garibaldi on the island of Caprera in 1857 she received affectionate letters from him and an ultimately unsuccessful proposal of marriage in 1858. After 1865 she lived in Chania. 

She took interest in animal welfare and criticized animal testing. In 1875, she read a German translation of George
Fleming's vivisection essay which inspired her anti-vivisection novel Gemma, oder Tugend und Laster (translated as Gemma, or Virtue and Vice). Melena's novel has been described as "mobilizing public opinion against vivisection in Germany".

References

External links
 

1899 deaths
1818 births
19th-century German writers
19th-century women writers
Anti-vivisectionists
German philhellenes
German women writers